Tim Coghlin (born March 24, 1964) is a college men's ice hockey coach. He has been the men's ice hockey head coach at St. Norbert College since 1994.

Hockey player
Coghlin grew up in western Canada and enrolled at the University of Wisconsin–Stevens Point. He was the captain of the 1989 Stevens Point team that won the NCAA Division III national championship for the first time in school history.  He was twice selected as an All-American defenseman.

Coghlin signed with the Vancouver Canucks in October 1989, and was assigned to the Milwaukee Admirals for the remainder of the year, though he didn't appear in any games. He injured his shoulder in training camp the following fall and ended up missing the entire season. In 1990, he played for the Fife Flyers as a player and assistant coach.

Hockey coach
Coghlin returned to Stevens Point in 1991 as an assistant hockey coach. He was part of the coaching staff on the Stevens Point teams that won the national title in 1993 and finished as the runner-up in 1992. After the '93 championship, he was named head coach for the 5-year-old program at St. Norbert College in De Pere, Wisconsin, and has been there ever since (as of 2021). Coghlin recalled the lack of talent when he arrived at St. Norbert, "When I came to St. Norbert, they weren't actively recruiting the same type of hockey players that other schools in the state were. We went immediately into western Canada and brought some kids in." Despite coaching at a private Catholic institution serving 2,100 students, Coghlin had success attracting quality players from Canada and Europe.

Coghlin led the St. Norbert Green Knights to their first national championship in 2008, winning both Frozen Four games by shutouts.  St. Norbert finished the 2008 season with a record of 27–1–4, the fewest losses ever for an NCAA Division III men's ice hockey champion at the time. Coghlin was named NCAA Division III Coach of the Year in 2008. Coghlin also led his team to the Frozen Four in 2003, 2004, 2006, 2007, 2008 and 2010. When St Norbert suspended operations for the 2020–21 season due to the COVID-19 pandemic, he was just 4 victories shy of 600 for his career and possessed the best winning percentage of any coach with at least 400 wins.

Statistics

Regular season and playoffs

Head coaching record

See also
List of college men's ice hockey coaches with 400 wins

References

1964 births
Fife Flyers players
Ice hockey people from British Columbia
Living people
University of Wisconsin–Stevens Point alumni
St. Norbert Green Knights men's ice hockey coaches
Canadian expatriate ice hockey players in the United States
Canadian expatriate ice hockey players in Scotland
People from Summerland, British Columbia
Canadian ice hockey defencemen